Bruton's tyrosine kinase (abbreviated Btk or BTK), also known as tyrosine-protein kinase BTK, is a tyrosine kinase that is encoded by the BTK gene in humans. BTK plays a crucial role in B cell development.

Structure 

BTK contains five different protein interaction domains. These domains include an amino terminal pleckstrin homology (PH) domain, a proline-rich TEC homology (TH) domain, SRC homology (SH) domains SH2 and SH3, as well as a kinase domain with enzymatic activity.

Function 

BTK plays a crucial role in B cell development as it is required for transmitting signals from the pre-B cell receptor that forms after successful immunoglobulin heavy chain rearrangement. It also has a role in mast cell activation through the high-affinity IgE receptor.

Btk contains a PH domain that binds phosphatidylinositol (3,4,5)-trisphosphate (PIP3). PIP3 binding induces Btk to phosphorylate phospholipase C, which in turn hydrolyzes PIP2, a phosphatidylinositol, into two second messengers, inositol triphosphate (IP3) and diacylglycerol (DAG), which then go on to modulate the activity of downstream proteins during B-cell signalling.

Clinical significance 

Mutations in the BTK gene are implicated in the primary immunodeficiency disease X-linked agammaglobulinemia (Bruton's agammaglobulinemia); sometimes abbreviated to XLA and selective IgM deficiency. Patients with XLA have normal pre-B cell populations in their bone marrow but these cells fail to mature and enter the circulation. The Btk gene is located on the X chromosome (Xq21.3-q22). At least 400 mutations of the BTK gene have been identified. Of these, at least 212 are considered to be disease-causing mutations.

BTK inhibitors 
Approved drugs that inhibit BTK:
 Ibrutinib (Imbruvica), a selective Bruton's tyrosine kinase inhibitor.
 Acalabrutinib (Calquence), approved in October 2017 for relapsed mantle cell lymphoma.
 Zanubrutinib (Brukinsa) for mantle cell lymphoma, chronic lymphocytic leukemia, or small lymphocytic lymphoma. It can be taken by mouth.
 Tirabrutinib (Velexbru), approved in March 2020, in Japan, for the treatment of recurrent or refractory primary central nervous system lymphoma.
 Pirtobrutinib (Jaypirca) for mantle cell lymphoma.

Various drugs that inhibit BTK are in clinical trials:

 Phase 3:
 Acalabrutinib, for relapsed chronic lymphocytic leukemia (CLL), 95% overall remission reported.
Evobrutinib for multiple sclerosis.
Tolebrutinib, for multiple sclerosis.
Remibrutinib, for multiple sclerosis.
 Phase 2:
 ABBV-105 for systemic lupus erythematosus (SLE)
Fenebrutinib (GDC-0853, RG7845) for rheumatoid arthritis, systemic lupus erythematosus, multiple sclerosis and chronic spontaneous urticaria.
 Phase 1:
 ONO-4059 for non-Hodgkin lymphoma and/or CLL. Renamed GS-4059 and now in trial NCT02457598.
 Spebrutinib (AVL-292, CC-292) 
HM71224 for autoimmune diseases, under development by Hanmi Pharmaceutical and Lilly as of 2015

Discovery 

Bruton's tyrosine kinase was discovered in 1993 and is named for Ogden Bruton, who first described XLA in 1952.

Interactions 

Bruton's tyrosine kinase has been shown to interact with:

 ARID3A 
 BLNK (SLP-65), 
 CAV1, 
 GNAQ, 
 GTF2I,
 PLCG2, 
 PRKD1,  and
 SH3BP5.

References

Further reading

External links 
 GeneReviews/NCBI/NIH/UW entry on X-Linked or Brunton's Agammaglobulinemia
 
 
 

Peripheral membrane proteins
Tyrosine kinases